Catch the Wave is an annual professional wrestling tournament promoted by the Pro Wrestling Wave promotion. It has been held since 2009 and takes place between the end of April and the beginning of August. As up until March 2013 there were no singles championships in Pro Wrestling Wave, Catch the Wave was effectively the top singles achievement in the promotion. The tournament is contested in round-robin format with the winners of each block advancing to the semifinals. From 2010 to 2012, the tournament included a "Loser Revival" battle royal, where already eliminated wrestlers battle for the fourth and final spot in the semifinals of the tournament. This system allowed the tournament to be won twice by a wrestler, who was originally eliminated in the round-robin section. From 2011 onwards, the tournament has concluded with an award ceremony. From 2014 to 2016, Wave also held a separate Catch the Wave tournament for rookie wrestlers, running concurrently with the main tournament.

List of winners
Main tournament

Rookie tournament

2009
The 2009 Catch the Wave took place over nine shows between May 27 and August 11. The tournament included sixteen participants split up into four blocks titled "Comical", "UK", "Visual Technical" and "Young". Matches in the UK block could only be won by knockout or submission and had a ten-minute time limit as opposed to fifteen-minute time limits in the other blocks. Outside participants in the tournament included freelancers Apple Miyuki, Bullfight Sora, Kaoru and Kyoko Kimura, JWP Joshi Puroresu's Pinky Mayuka and Sendai Girls' Pro Wrestling's Ryo Mizunami.

2010
The 2010 Catch the Wave took place over ten shows between May 30 and August 11. The tournament included fifteen participants split up into three blocks titled "Rival", "Visual Technical" and "Young". Outside participants in the tournament included freelancers Asami Kawasaki, Io Shirai, Kana and Mio Shirai, JWP Joshi Puroresu's Senri Kuroki and Sendai Girls' Pro Wrestling's Ryo Mizunami. On July 4, Kuroki was sidelined with gastroesophageal reflux disease and was forced to forfeit the rest of her matches in the tournament. This tournament introduced the concept of the "Loser Revival" battle royal, where those that finished second and third in their blocks were allowed to compete for a spot in the semifinals of the tournament.

August 10:
Visual Technical block third place playoff match: Gami defeated Toshie Uematsu (1:22).
Loser Revival battle royal: Gami defeated Asami Kawasaki, Cherry, Io Shirai, Kana and Misaki Ohata (8:15).

2011
The 2011 Catch the Wave took place over eight shows between May 2 and July 24. The tournament included fourteen participants split up into three blocks titled "Technical", "Visual" and "Young". Outside participants in the tournament included freelancer Nagisa Nozaki, Kagetsu and Ryo Mizunami from Sendai Girls' Pro Wrestling and Nao Komatsu from Oz Academy. This was the first tournament, where all wrestlers eliminated after the round-robin portion of the tournament were allowed to enter the "Loser Revival" battle royal.

July 24:
Loser Revival battle royal: Kana defeated Ayumi Kurihara, Mika Iida, Mio Shirai, Nagisa Nozaki, Nao Komatsu, Ryo Mizunami, Sawako Shimono, Tomoka Nakagawa and Yumi Ohka (8:28).

Post-tournament awards:
Best Bout Award: Ayumi Kurihara vs. Yumi Ohka, May 29
Best Performance Award: Nao Komatsu cheering squad
Fighting Spirit Award: Mika Iida
Outstanding Performance Award: Mio Shirai
Technique Award: Tomoka Nakagawa

2012
The 2012 Catch the Wave took place over nine shows between April 30 and July 16. The tournament included fifteen participants split up into three blocks titled "Black Dahlia", "Power" and "White Tails", with two of the blocks made up of members of the Black Dahlia and White Tails stables. Outside participants in the tournament included Hamuko Hoshi and Tsukasa Fujimoto from Ice Ribbon and Syuri from Wrestling New Classic (WNC). The tournament featured a title change, when on June 8, Mio Shirai defeated Ayumi Kurihara to win DDT Pro-Wrestling's Ironman Heavymetalweight Championship.

July 1:
Loser Revival battle royal: Misaki Ohata defeated Ayako Hamada, Aya Yuki, Cherry, Hamuko Hoshi, Hanako Nakamori, Kana, Mio Shirai, Sawako Shimono, Shuu Shibutani, Syuri and Tsukasa Fujimoto (13:20).

Post-tournament awards:
Best Bout Award: Ayumi Kurihara vs. Syuri, June 24
Best Performance Award: Hamuko Hoshi
Fighting Spirit Award: Hamuko Hoshi
Outstanding Performance Award: Sawako Shimono
Technique Award: Tsukasa Fujimoto

2013
The 2013 Catch the Wave took take place over ten shows between May 6 and July 15. The tournament format, which for the first time featured only two round-robin blocks, and the participants were announced on April 26. Outside participants included Arisa Nakajima from JWP Joshi Puroresu, Hikaru Shida from Ice Ribbon, Kagetsu from Sendai Girls' Pro Wrestling and Syuri from Wrestling New Classic (WNC). The top three wrestlers from each block advanced to the knockout stage of the tournament. The winners of the blocks earned spots in the semifinals, while numbers two and three were entered into the first round of the knockout tournament. The two block system resulted in the elimination of the "Loser Revival" battle royal. The tournament featured the first Catch the Wave match to take place outside of Pro Wrestling Wave, when Shuu Shibutani and Syuri faced each other on June 8 in Wave's sister promotion, Osaka Joshi Pro Wrestling. The winner of the tournament became the number one contender to the Wave Single Championship.

June 28:
Glamorous block third place playoff match: Misaki Ohata defeated Kagetsu and Ryo Mizunami (11:28).
Slender block third place playoff match: Shuu Shibutani defeated Cherry, Hikaru Shida and Mio Shirai (10:37).

July 15:
Third place four-way elimination match: Shuu Shibutani defeated Syuri, Tomoka Nakagawa and Yuu Yamagata (3:58).
Post-tournament awards:
Best Bout Award: Ayako Hamada vs. Ryo Mizunami, May 26
Best Performance Award: Shuu Shibutani
Fighting Spirit Award: Kagetsu
Outstanding Performance Award: Mio Shirai
Technique Award: Yuu Yamagata

2014
The 2014 Catch the Wave took place between May 5 and July 27. The tournament once again featured two round-robin blocks of seven wrestlers, divided by their age. Block "Adeyaka" ("Elegant") featured wrestlers in their thirties and block "Tsuyayaka" ("Glossy") wrestlers in their twenties. Outside participants included Tsukasa Fujimoto from Ice Ribbon and freelancers Hikaru Shida, Hiroyo Matsumoto, Kyoko Kimura and Kyusei Sakura Hirota.

July 13:
Adeyaka block second and third place playoff three-way match:Kyoko Kimura vs. Tomoka Nakagawa vs. Tsukasa FujimotoFujimoto defeated Nakagawa (12:34),Nakagawa defeated Kimura (17:37).

July 27:
Third place four-way match:Tomoka Nakagawa defeated Hiroyo Matsumoto, Tsukasa Fujimoto and Yumi Ohka (6:17).
Post-tournament awards:
Best Bout Award: Kyoko Kimura vs. Kyusei Sakura Hirota, May 13
Best Performance Award: Tsukasa Fujimoto led Ice Ribbon
Fighting Spirit Award: Kyusei Sakura Hirota
Outstanding Performance Award: Mika Iida
Technique Award: Kyusei Sakura Hirota

Catch the Young Wave
Concurrently to the 2014 Catch the Wave tournament, Pro Wrestling Wave also held the first Catch the Young Wave tournament, where six rookie wrestlers competed for a ¥500,000 main prize. Outside participants in the tournament included Risa Sera and Shiori Akiba from Ice Ribbon and Kaho Kobayashi from Wrestling New Classic (WNC)/Reina Joshi Puroresu. Akiba was forced to pull out of the tournament and forfeit her final two matches, after being sidelined as a result of headaches and memory impairment on June 18. The block ended in a four-way tie on June 27, leading to Wave announcing a single-elimination tournament between the four to determine the winner.

2015
The 2015 Catch the Wave took place between May 3 and July 20. The tournament featured a single round-robin block with ten wrestlers. The four previous still active winners; Yumi Ohka, Kana, Misaki Ohata and Hikaru Shida as well as the reigning Catch the Young Wave winner Kaho Kobayashi, earned automatic spots in the tournament. Gami picked one wrestler to enter the tournament, while the remaining four were decided in qualifying matches on April 4. Cherry, Kyusei Sakura Hirota, Mika Iida and Ryo Mizunami ended up earning their spots in the tournament in a nine-woman battle royal, while Rina Yamashita was chosen by Gami as the final entrant. In the tournament, instead of points, rankings were based on winning percentages or simply the number of wins. Two matches in the tournament took place at an Osaka Joshi Pro Wrestling event.

Post-tournament awards:
Best Bout Award: Ryo Mizunami vs. Yumi Ohka, June 10
Best Performance Award: Wonderful World Fairy Family (Ayako Hamada, Chikayo Nagashima, Fairy Nipponbashi, Tsukasa Fujimoto, Yumi Ohka and Yuu Yamagata)
Fighting Spirit Award: Ryo Mizunami
Outstanding Performance Award: Mika Iida
Technique Award: Mika Iida
Raspberry Award: Kaho Kobayashi vs. Kyusei Sakura Hirota, June 14

Young Block Oh! Oh! 2015
The rookie version of Catch the Wave started on May 29 with six participants, including five outsiders; Konami from Office Kana/Reina Joshi Puroresu, Maya Yukihi and Yuka from Ice Ribbon, Meiko Tanaka from World Woman Pro-Wrestling Diana and Yako Fujigasaki from JWP Joshi Puroresu. The tournament took place in a single-elimination format with Konami and Yuka earning automatic spots to in the semifinals. Matches had a ten-minute time limit in the tournament. In case of a time limit draw, the match would enter a five-minute overtime, where the match can be won with only a two-count. If the match again ended in a time limit draw, it would be restarted with no time limit in a match that can be won with only a one-count. The winner of the tournament would receive ¥500,000 and a shot at the JWP Junior and Princess of Pro-Wrestling Championships. Both of the tournament's finalists were injured before the final match with Meiko Tanaka dislocating her right elbow and Yuka suffering a cervical spinal cord contusion and subarachnoid hemorrhage. As Yuka was injured first, Wave originally awarded Tanaka the final with a bye, declaring her the winner of the tournament. However, on the final day of the tournament, Gami instead announced that they were postponing the final match until both wrestlers were able to return to the ring. The final eventually took place on October 30.

2016
The 2016 Catch the Wave took place between April 10 and June 5. The tournament featured 32 wrestlers in eight blocks of four, making it the largest Catch the Wave tournament in history. In the tournament a win was worth two points and a loss none. In case of a draw, the wrestler who debuted at a later date would be awarded one point. The winners from each block would advance to a single-elimination tournament. If a block ended in a tie, a playoff match would determine the advancer.

Playoff matches
Ryo Mizunami defeated Chikayo Nagashima (12:50)
Mika Iida defeated Melanie Cruise and Tsukushi (6:53)

Post-tournament awards:
Best Bout Award: Mika Iida vs. Tsukushi, May 3
Best Performance Award: Referee Ishiguro and Mayumi Ozaki
Fighting Spirit Award: Rabbit Miu
Outstanding Performance Award: Hiroe Nagahama

Young Block Oh! Oh! 2016
The 2016 rookie version of Catch the Wave took place between February 6 and March 13 with eight participants in two blocks. Outside participants included Akane Fujita, Maruko Nagasaki and Yuka from Ice Ribbon, Konami from Reina Joshi Puroresu, Mari An from Sportiva and Yako Fujigasaki from JWP Joshi Puroresu. For the first time, the tournament ran before the main tournament. The winner of the tournament earned a spot in the 2016 Catch the Wave tournament. In the tournament, wins were worth two points and losses zero. In case of a time limit draw, the wrestler who debuted at a later date would be awarded one point. One of the matches in the tournament took place at an event held by Wave's sister promotion Osaka Joshi Pro Wrestling.

2017
The 2017 Catch the Wave took place between April 19 and June 4. The tournament featured eight wrestlers in two blocks of four, making it the smallest Catch the Wave tournament in history. The participants wrestled in a single block, but in point standings were divided into two blocks by their affiliation. Wrestlers signed to Pro Wrestling Wave, wrestled in the "Zabun" block, while outsiders wrestled in the "Other Than" block, which included Ice Ribbon representative Mochi Miyagi, Marvelous representative Rin Kadokura, Seadlinnng representative Sareee and freelancer Saki. In the tournament a win was worth two points, a draw one point and a loss none. The top two wrestlers from each block advanced to the semifinals.

Post-tournament awards:
Best Bout Award: Hiroe Nagahama vs. Misaki Ohata, May 23
Fighting Spirit Award: Rin Kadokura
Outstanding Performance Award: Hiroe Nagahama
Technique Award: Mochi Miyagi

2018
The 2018 Catch the Wave took place between March 11 and May 4. The tournament featured twelve wrestlers in two blocks of six, the Crazy Block and the Violence Block. In the tournament a win was worth two points, a draw one point and a loss none. On April 7, Hikaru Shida announced she would be dropping out to receive surgery on a distal tibia fracture, forfeiting the rest of her matches. The top wrestler from each block was to advance to the finals, however both blocks ended in ties. Because Violence Block ended in a three-way tie, the tiebreaker was determined to be a gauntlet match where the first woman to win two consecutive falls would advance.

Post-tournament awards:
Best Bout Award: Misaki Ohata vs. Hikaru Shida, March 23
Fighting Spirit Award: Mio Momono & Miyuki Takase (Reason: Teamed with the competitors during multi-person tag matches.)
Outstanding Performance Award: Yuki Miyazaki & Sakura Hirota (Reason: Did their best in a tough block without getting injured.)
Technique Award: Asuka (Reason: Worked through a broken ankle for the entire tournament.)
Special Prize: Hiroe Nagahama (Reason: Defeated the Regina di WAVE Champion Misaki Ohata in a surprise upset.)

2019 
The 2019 Catch the Wave took place between May 5 and July 15. The tournament featured sixteen wrestlers in four blocks of four, the Power Block, the Technical Block, the Visual Block and the Young Block. With the Wave Single Championship being vacated due to the last champion Misaki Ohata's retirement from professional wrestling, the winner of the tournament would win the vacant title as well. The Young Block competed independently of the main tournament. Mika Iwata was injured on June, therefore, was out of the tournament.

In the finals, Takumi Iroha defeated Nagisa Nozaki and Ryo Mizunami in a three-way match to win the tournament and the title.

2021 
The 2021 Catch the Wave took place between June 1 and July 1. The tournament featured sixteen wrestlers in four blocks of four, the Compliance Block, the Gatling Block, the Jealousy Block and the Potential Block. The winner will be given an opportunity to challenge for the Wave Single Championship.

 Post-tournament awards:
 Best Bout Award: Tomoko Watanabe vs. Yako, June 8
 Distinguished Service Award: Mio Momono
 Fighting Spirit Award: Mio Momono
 Outstanding Performance Award: Hibiscus Mii

Young Block Oh! Oh! 2021
The 2021 Young Block tournament took place beginning with May 18 and culminated on May 28.

2022 
The 2022 edition of the tournament will take place between May 5 and July 17, 2022.

Qualifier Blocks

Due to certain point ties from the qualifier blocks, there have been a couple of decision matches which took place on June 22 to determine the wrestlers who have further qualified in the final blocks.

Winner Blocks
Due to Nagisa Nozaki being one of the finalists of the tournament, the final match will also be for her Wave Single Championship and will take place on July 17.

Notes

See also
Dual Shock Wave
Pro Wrestling Wave

References

External links
The official Pro Wrestling Wave website

Pro Wrestling Wave
Women's professional wrestling tournaments